Hrvoje Telišman (born 25 December 1972) is a Croatian rower. He competed in the men's double sculls event at the 1996 Summer Olympics.

References

1972 births
Living people
Croatian male rowers
Olympic rowers of Croatia
Rowers at the 1996 Summer Olympics
Sportspeople from Zagreb